Marion Burns (August 9, 1907 – December 22, 1993) was an American film actress of the 1930s.  She is best known for having starred opposite John Wayne in the 1935 film The Dawn Rider and opposite him again that same year in Paradise Canyon, as well as a large supporting role in Me and My Gal (1932) starring Spencer Tracy and Joan Bennett.

Biography

Early years 
Burns was born in Los Angeles, California, making her way to Hollywood to pursue a career in acting. She earned a bachelor's degree in dramatics from the University of California. Burns was active in stock theater. Her Broadway credits include Intimate Relations and They Don't Mean Any Harm, both in 1931.

Film 
Burns received her first film role in 1931, starring opposite Bill Cody in Oklahoma Jim. That film started her on the path of starring in Western films as a heroine. In 1932, she starred opposite George O'Brien in The Golden West, followed by Raoul Walsh's modern-day comedy Me and My Gal (1932) with Spencer Tracy and Joan Bennett that same year, which showcased Burns with a lot of screen time. In 1933, she starred in Sensation Hunters opposite Preston Foster; 1934 and 1935 were her biggest years, with her appearing in six films, three each year, two of which were uncredited, and the most notable being the two John Wayne films. Her first film in 1934 was Devil Tiger.

In Devil Tiger, Director Clyde E. Elliott allowed his hero, Kane Richmond, to fight a 25-foot python with no stuntman. Richmond hated doubles and had insisted. The actor, on his feet, on the ground, on his feet again, succeeded in holding the snake's snapping mouth away from his face, while struggling to free himself from the triple coils around his body. At the height of the struggle, the heroine, Marion Burns, runs in and saves the hero from the python. Miss Burns had to fight the snake, too, to get at Richmond's pistol, with which she was supposed to shoot the python. She played her own scene, as well.

In the 1934 film Born to Be Bad, Burns starred alongside Cary Grant and Loretta Young. In her last film of 1935, she starred opposite Lloyd Hughes in the crime drama Rip Roaring Riley. It was her last film for a span of 10 years.

She returned to acting three times and only briefly following 1935. The first time was in a stage appearance in Leaning on Letty in January 1936 at the El Capitan Theatre in Los Angeles. The second time was in 1945 alongside her husband in Brenda Starr, Reporter, which starred Kane Richmond and Joan Woodbury. The third time was in 1961, when she appeared on one episode of the television series My Three Sons.

Personal life 
Burns married twice during her career. Her first marriage to actor Bruce MacFarlane ended in divorce. Her second marriage was in 1934 to actor Kane Richmond, though reports in January 1934 state that they had been married in secret in May 1933. Burns and Richmond had two daughters.

Later years 
Burns eventually settled in Laguna Niguel, California, where she was living at the time of her death on December 22, 1993.

Filmography

References

External links
 
 

1907 births
1993 deaths
American film actresses
Actresses from Los Angeles
20th-century American actresses
People from Laguna Niguel, California